Stitt is a surname. Notable people with the surname include:

 Alex Stitt (1937–2016), Australian cartoonist
 Allan J. Stitt (born 1961), Canadian arbitrator, mediator and film producer
 Andre Stitt (born 1958), Irish performance artist
 Bernard Munroe Stitt (1880–1942), Canadian politician
 Bob Stitt (born 1964), American football coach
 Don Stitt, (born 1956) American actor and playwright
 Donald K. Stitt (1944–2014), American politician from Wisconsin
 Frank Stitt, American chef & cookbook writer
 Garren Stitt (born 2003), American actor and singer
 Georgia Stitt (born 1972), American composer and lyricist
 James Stitt (disambiguation), multiple people, including:
James Stitt (high constable), (1804–1891), Irish-born High Constable of Toronto
James C. Stitt (1866–1949), American architect
James Herbert Stitt (1891–1958), Canadian politician and lawyer
 John Stitt (fl. 1919), American college football coach
 Kevin Stitt, American businessman and current governor of Oklahoma
 King Stitt (born 1940), Jamaican musician
 Milan Stitt (1941–2009), American playwright and educator
 Sam Stitt (born 1981), American rower
 Sonny Stitt (1924–1982), American jazz saxophonist

See also
Stitt House, Hot Springs, Arkansas
David Stitt Mound, near Chillicothe, Ohio
Stitt, Ratlinghope, Shropshire